Bhumarashuwa  is a village development committee in Udayapur District in the Sagarmatha Zone of south-eastern Nepal. At the time of the 1991 Nepal census it had a population of 13,631 people living in 2531 individual households.

References

External links
UN map of the municipalities of Udayapur District

Populated places in Udayapur District